Talea is a 2013 Austrian coming-of-age drama film written and directed by Katharina Mückstein in her feature film directorial debut. The film made its world premiere at the Max Ophüls Festival on 23 January 2013. It was released in theaters in Austria by Filmdelights on 13 September 2013. The film received two nominations for the Austrian Film Award: Best Director and Best Screenplay.

Plot 
It's Summertime in Austria and everyone is looking forward to their vacation in Italy. Everyone except 14-year-old Jasmin. She longs for her biological mother, Eva, who has just been released from prison. Jasmin runs away from her foster family and persuades Eva to go away with her. They grow closer, but when a man catches Eva's eye, the newly formed mother-daughter relationship is threatened.

Cast 
 Nina Proll as Eve
 Sophie Stockinger as Jasmine
 Lili Epply as Melanie
 Philipp Hochmair as Stefan
 Andrew Patton as Peter
 Eva Maria Gintsberg as Inge
 Rita Waszilovics as parole officer
 Alina Schaller as Elena

Awards and nominations

References

External links 
 
 

2013 films
Austrian drama films
2013 drama films
2010s German-language films
2013 directorial debut films
2013 independent films
2010s coming-of-age films
Austrian independent films
Films set in Austria
Films shot in Austria
Films about mother–daughter relationships
Films about dysfunctional families
Films about teenagers
Films directed by Katharina Mückstein